Classical 94.7 (经典947) is a classical music radio station in Shanghai, China. It is owned and operated by the Shanghai Media Group and is the only classical music radio station in mainland China.

History
In 2014, the station entered into a cultural exchange with Chicago's WFMT; underwritten by Abbott Laboratories, which operates in China, the exchange saw Classical 94.7 air programming supplied by WFMT on Friday evenings and WFMT producers travel to China to record performances at the Shanghai Spring International Music Festival.

References

External links
经典947

See also
List of radio stations in China

Radio stations in China
Shanghai Media Group
Mandarin-language radio stations
Radio stations established in 2004
2004 establishments in China